The Witch trials of Fulda in Germany from 1603 to 1606 resulted in the death of about 250 people.  They were one of the four largest witch trials in Germany, along with the Trier witch trials, the Würzburg witch trial, and the Bamberg witch trials.   The persecutions were ordered by the Catholic Prince Bishop, a follower of the Counter-Reformation. Crypto-protestants were executed on charges of witchcraft.

History

The witch trials were ordered by Prince-abbot Balthasar von Dernbach, who had been exiled by the Lutherans in 1576 after his Counter-Reformation policies, and returned to power in 1602.  He resumed the Counter-Reformation, and announced an investigation of witches and other undesirables. 

The witchcraft persecutions were presided over by Balthasar Nuss, who had attached himself to the abbot during his exile and afterward was appointed Zentgraf of Hofbieber and Malefizmeister. 

Investigations began in March 1603, and shortly thereafter, the arrests begun in the city. One of the first and the most well-known victim was Merga Bien, whose case even concerned the Imperial Chamber Court.

Dornbach was a follower of the Counter-Reformation, and Nuss arrested crypto-protestants on charges of witchcraft alongside others.

The exact number of victims is not known, but they are known to have been at least over 200; the accusers of Nuss accused him of having accused 239 people, while he admitted to 205.

The witch hunts ceased soon after the Prince-abbot died on 15 March 1605. in 1606, Nuss was imprisoned and accused of having enriched himself. Nuss remained in custody for 13 years; after the university of Ingolstadt ruled to that effect, Nuss was beheaded in 1618.

Reception

In 2008 a memorial for the victims of the witch trials was established in Fulda.

References

Sources
Heinrich Heppe, . 1850
Karl Eder, Die Kirche im Zeitalter des konfessionellen Absolutismus (1555–1648), 1949, 69. 295 f.
 Ingrid Möller-Münch, …ach Gott, so wil ich es gethan haben. Das Leben der Merga Bien. Beitrag zur Hexenverfolgung im Hochstift Fulda (1603 - 1606). Fulda 2008

Witch trials in Germany
1603 in law
1604 in law
1605 in law
1606 in law
Fulda
History of Hesse
1603 in the Holy Roman Empire
1604 in the Holy Roman Empire
1605 in the Holy Roman Empire
1606 in the Holy Roman Empire